Richard Seeley (born April 30, 1979) is a Canadian former ice hockey defenceman. In 2018, he was named the general manager of the Ontario Reign in the American Hockey League by the Reign's NHL affiliate, the Los Angeles Kings.

Playing career
Seeley was drafted in the 6th round, 137th overall, by the Los Angeles Kings in the 1997 NHL Entry Draft but never played in the NHL.  He played mainly for the Lowell Lock Monsters, Manchester Monarchs, Bridgeport Sound Tigers and the Norfolk Admirals.  He also had a spell in the East Coast Hockey League with the Trenton Titans.  In 2006, he moved to Germany's Deutsche Eishockey Liga for and played for Füchse Duisburg. In 2007–08 he played for Vienna Capitals in Austria and recorded 20 assists for 22 points in 38 games before signing with EHC Black Wings Linz for the 2008–09 season.

On November 10, 2009, Seeley was granted a trial with KHL Medveščak before signing a one-year contract to compete in the 2009–10 season.

On August 4, 2010, Richard left Croatia and signed a one-year contract with the Belfast Giants in the Elite Ice Hockey League in the U.K. Seeley was named into the Elite League Select team to face the Boston Bruins in an exhibition game on October 2, 2010 in Belfast.  His season was cut short due to injury which ended his playing career.

Coaching and Management career
In 2015, he returned to the Los Angeles Kings' organization when he was named the head coach of the Manchester Monarchs, their minor league affiliate now in the ECHL. After three seasons and three playoff appearances, he was promoted to the general manager position with the Kings' American Hockey League affiliate, the Ontario Reign in 2018.

Career statistics

References

External links

1979 births
Belfast Giants players
Bridgeport Sound Tigers players
Canadian ice hockey defencemen
EHC Black Wings Linz players
Füchse Duisburg players
KHL Medveščak Zagreb players
Ice hockey people from British Columbia
Lethbridge Hurricanes players
Living people
Los Angeles Kings draft picks
Lowell Lock Monsters players
Manchester Monarchs (AHL) players
Norfolk Admirals players
People from Powell River, British Columbia
Powell River Kings players
Prince Albert Raiders players
Trenton Titans players
Vienna Capitals players
Canadian expatriate ice hockey players in Northern Ireland
Canadian expatriate ice hockey players in Austria
Canadian expatriate ice hockey players in Croatia
Canadian expatriate ice hockey players in Germany
Canadian expatriate ice hockey players in the United States